Trachyaretaon is a genus of stick insects native to the Philippines.

Taxonomy 
In 1939 James Abram Garfield Rehn and his son John William Holman Rehn established the genus Aretaon with the subgenus Trachyaretaon. In this they placed a species already described as Obrimus echinatus in 1877. While "Aretaon" is borrowed from Greek mythology, where it is among other things the name of a defender of Troy, the Prefix "Trachy" comes from the Greek trachys (τραχύς), which means rough and refers to the texture of the body surface. Trachyaretaon was transferred in 2004 by Oliver Zompro to the rank of a genus, whose type species thereby became Trachyaretaon echinatus. In addition, with Trachyaretaon gatla another species was described.

In 2005 Ireneo L. Lit, Jr. and Orlando L. Eusebio described Trachyaretaon carmelae, the largest species of the genus to date. The description was based on specimens collected the year before on the island of Dalupiri. Already in 2003 animals were found on the neighboring island of Calayan, which were described by Oskar V. Conle and Frank H. Hennemann as Trachyaretaon brueckneri in 2006. Since the publication of the description was delayed, it overlapped with that of Lit and Eusebio. A short time later, Conle and Hennemann discovered that Trachyaretaon brueckneri is the same species previously described as Trachyaretaon carmelae. Since then, they have also given Trachyaretaon carmelae as a valid name for Trachyaretaon brueckneri. A formal synonymization has not yet taken place.

In 2005 Lit and Eusebio described another species as Trachyaretaon manobo, which was found on Mount Apo on Mindanao. A short time later, specialists such as Joachim Bresseel assumed that this species was not a member of the genus Trachyaretaon, but rather the Mearnsiana bullosa described in 1939. In 2016, Hennemann et al synonymized Trachyaretaon manobo with Mearnsiana bullosa.

In May 2008 Jeffebeck Arimas collected specimens from the volcanoes Kanlaon and Mandalagan on Negros Island, which were initially known as Trachyaretaon sp. 'Negros'. In 2021 published genetic analysis carried out on the phylogeny of the Heteropterygidae show that this species does not belong to Trachyaretaon. It is more closely related to Sungaya, with which it has already been crossed. Since it has to be granted its own genus, it is referred to as Obrimini sp. 'Negros' until it is described.

In 2008, Dave Navarro found another member of the genus in the north of Luzon. From this also named Trachyaretaon sp. 'North-Luzon' designated species, so far only females are known.

Also on Luzon, more precisely in the province Nueva Vizcaya near the Imugan falls, local naturalists found females of a very similar population in two independent locations in June 2015. Since only females hatched from the eggs of the adult females, a purely parthenogenetic occurrence is assumed. The representatives of this animal are named Trachyaretaon sp. 'Imugan Falls'.

Another undescribed or indefinite species was discovered in 2009 by Bresseel on Luzon in the province Aurora near the city San Luis at the waterfalls of Cunayan and Ditumabo . It is known as Trachyaretaon sp. 'Aurora.

Description 
The representatives of this genus correspond in the habitus typical representatives of the Obrimini and are very similar in appearance to the species of the genera Aretaon and Sungaya. Like these, they are wingless in either sex. In egg-laying adult females, the abdomen in the middle is clearly thickened in height and width and thus almost circular in cross-section. As with the other genera of the Obriminae, a secondary ovipositor at the end of the abdomen surrounds the actual ovipositor. It is ventral formed from the eighth sternite, which is called subgenital plate or operculum and dorsally from the eleventh tergum, which here is called the supraanal plate or epiproct.

In contrast to Aretaon species, those of the genus Trachyaretaon lack the clear spines in the front area of the mesonotum. Unlike the representatives of the genera Brasidas, Euobrimus and Obrimus are found in them in the metasternum neither holes nor pits nor noticeable slits. The Trachyaretaon species differ from Sungaya inexpectata in the shape of the eggs, among other things.

Distribution 
The previously known distribution area of the genus extends over the Philippine islands Palawan, Luzon and Babuyan Islands. On the latter, representatives on Calayan Island and Dalupiri are proven. Whether the genus also occurs on Mindanao is uncertain or still controversial.

Way of life and reproduction 
Although all species are active at night and at dawn, they hardly hide. During the day they can usually be found on the food plants that they feed on at night. They are usually dark gray to dark brown in color and resemble their faeces. At the front pole of the eggs there is a circular lid (operculum). The micropylar plate has three arms and its shape usually resembles an upside-down "Y", with the arm pointing to the lid being significantly longer than the arms pointing to the lower pole, which can also be bent. The eggs are laid in the ground using ovipositor. The nymphs hatch after three to four months. They are clearly more prickly than the imago. Depending on the species and sex, it takes five to eight months until they are adult. Males take less time. In some Trachyaretaon species parthenogenesis has been found.

In terraristics 
The first animals of the genus that found their way into the lovers' terrariums go back to the animals collected by Ismael O. Lumawig on Calayan Island in April 2003, which are also the basis for the description of Trachyaretaon brueckneri. For this reason, they were initially in circulation under this name. Since around 2009 the species has been referred to almost everywhere as Trachyaretaon carmelae, although formal synonymisation is still pending. The Phasmid Study Group gave the species PSG number 255.

Also called Trachyaretaon sp. 'North-Luzon' and Trachyaretaon sp. 'Imugan Falls' came to Europe shortly after their discovery. Here they were first bred and distributed by Bruno Kneubühler. Both are so far only parthenogenetically in breeding.

Since around 2011, the Trachyaretaon sp. 'Aurora' designated animals can be found in the terrariums of lovers. Initially they were identified as Trachyaretaon echinatus. However, the wrong assignment was recognized a little later and so the animals are in circulation under the name describing the location. The Phasmid Study Group has the species under PSG number 317.

A short time after the introduction of Trachyaretaon sp. In 'Aurora' the first animals identified as Trachyaretaon echinatus came alive to Europe. The breeding stock goes back to animals collected in Marinfata on Luzon. From the Phasmid Study Group it received the PSG number 326.

The keeping and breeding of the species mentioned is considered easy. They willingly feed on various forage plants such as bramble, hazel, firethorn and ivy. They need moderately moist terrariums with a substrate for laying eggs.

References

External links
 
 

Phasmatodea
Phasmatodea genera
Phasmatodea of Asia
Taxa described in 1939